Wanjiang Subdistrict is a subdistrict of the city of Dongguan, Guangdong Province, China. It is also the home of the world's largest shopping mall, New South China Mall.

Geography of Dongguan
Township-level divisions of Guangdong
Subdistricts of the People's Republic of China